Donna Marie Roberts (born May 22, 1944), an American convicted of being an accomplice to murder, is the only woman on death row in the State of Ohio.

Early life
Roberts was born and raised in Youngstown, Ohio and was a student of Austintown Fitch High School. She enrolled at Youngstown State University for two years, and in 1966, she married her first husband, William Raymond, and moved to Miami, Florida. She had one child, Michael Raymond, in 1969. She and William Raymond divorced in 1971. She remarried her second husband, Burton Gelfand, in 1972 and later divorced him in 1980. Roberts converted to Judaism while living in Miami, Florida, and worked as a plastic surgeon assistant for over 20 years in North Miami Beach. Roberts met her late husband, Robert Fingerhut, in 1980. They married and bought a home in Miami, near Miami Gardens and Ives Estates in 1983. They later sold their home and moved to Richmond, Virginia for one year, and in 1993, the couple moved back to Roberts' hometown of Youngstown, Ohio. Roberts purchased their new home in Warren in 1994 on Fonderlac Avenue. During this time, Roberts and Fingerhut managed the Avis Car Rental franchise at the Youngstown–Warren Regional Airport for several years. They later managed both the Youngstown and Warren Greyhound bus stations and turned them into successful locations. For a short period, Roberts also ran a small restaurant located within the Youngstown Bus Terminal called "Just the Ticket."

Murder conviction
Roberts was convicted in 2003 of complicity in aggravated murder and conspiracy to commit murder. Roberts was having an affair with Nathaniel E. Jackson before he was sent to prison for a separate offense. While Jackson was still in prison, he stated in letters and phone calls that he would kill her ex-husband, Robert Fingerhut, which he did on December 11, 2001, in the house Roberts and Fingerhut shared. In Roberts' appeal, it was alleged that the police performed an illegal search of her car parked inside the garage since the search warrant was only for the home. Jackson stated that Roberts had no knowledge of his planned actions, videotaped during his confession by the police; he also stated this during his trial. Jackson was sentenced to death for his role in the murder. In addition to phone calls and letters between Roberts and Jackson, investigators said Roberts bought Jackson a mask and gloves to wear while committing the crime, even allowing him into the home where the murder occurred.

In the media
In the years since their conviction, Roberts and Jackson's case has been featured on Deadly Women, Snapped: Killer Couples, Calls From the Inside, Season 2, and For My Man.

See also
 Capital punishment in Ohio
 List of women on death row in the United States

References

External links
 Ohio Department of Rehabilitation and Correction - Offender Search Detail: Nathaniel E. Jackson
 Ohio Department of Rehabilitation and Correction - Offender Search Detail: Donna Marie Roberts

1944 births
2001 murders in the United States
Living people
American female murderers
American prisoners sentenced to death
American people convicted of murder
Prisoners sentenced to death by Ohio
People convicted of murder by Ohio
Women sentenced to death
Mariticides
Criminals from Ohio
21st-century American criminals
People from Youngstown, Ohio
Youngstown State University alumni